Barrett Pond is a , warm water pond in the Myles Standish State Forest in Carver, Massachusetts, located less than ½ mile north of the forest headquarters, west of East Head Reservoir, and southwest of College Pond in Plymouth. Most of the shoreline is undeveloped except for a campground area on the eastern shore. Access is possible off Lower College Pond Road and is suitable only for car top boats or canoes, electric motors only.

External links
MassWildlife - Pond Maps

Ponds of Plymouth County, Massachusetts
Ponds of Massachusetts